The two slashes // may indicate:
 a comment in several programming languages including C, C++ and Java
 the root directory path in Domain/OS
 the operator for integer division, in Python 2.2+ and other programming languages
 the empty pattern in Perl, which evaluates the last successfully matched regular expression
 the logical defined-or operator in Perl, called the null coalescing operator in other programming languages
 the authority indicator in the URI scheme, which follows a colon (://) from the scheme component 
 the descendant-or-self axis specifier in XPath
 an emoticon symbolizing blushing or embarrassment
 an empty segment of a file path
 a double vertical bar (||) where the vertical line character  is unavailable for technical reasons
 the parallel operator stylized in pseudo-italics
 a caesura in musical notation

Text enclosed by two slashes / / may represent:
 Broad phonetic transcription
 Italic type in computer files or communications that do not support rich text
 Subforums or imageboards when referred to by URL path segment

See also
 Slash (punctuation)
 Backslash
 /\ (disambiguation)
 /r/ (disambiguation)
 \/ (disambiguation)
 \\ (disambiguation)
 ◌⃫